High vacuum may refer to:

 A vacuum with pressure in the range from 100 mPa to 100 nPa
 High Vacuum, the 1957 novel by Charles Eric Maine

See also:
Ultra-high vacuum